Douglas Arthur "DA" Sims II is a United States Army lieutenant general who serves as the director of operations of the Joint Staff. He most recently served as commanding general of the 1st Infantry Division and Fort Riley from August 14, 2020 to May 11, 2022, and prior to that served as Deputy Director for Regional Operations and Force Management of the Joint Staff from June 2018 to June 2020.

References

External links
 

Year of birth missing (living people)
Living people
Date of birth missing (living people)
United States Military Academy alumni
Webster University alumni
Massachusetts Institute of Technology alumni
Recipients of the Distinguished Service Medal (US Army)
Recipients of the Defense Superior Service Medal
Recipients of the Legion of Merit
United States Army generals
United States Army Rangers